Pablo Villar (born 4 September 1986) is a Spanish football manager who currently manages Riteriai.

References

External links
 
 

Living people
1986 births
People from Avilés
Spanish football managers
Spanish expatriate football managers
Luarca CF managers
CD Tineo managers
Urraca CF managers
FK Pohronie managers
FK Riteriai managers
Tercera División managers
Divisiones Regionales de Fútbol managers
Slovak Super Liga managers
A Lyga managers
Spanish expatriate sportspeople in Slovakia
Expatriate football managers in Slovakia
Spanish expatriate sportspeople in Ukraine
Expatriate football managers in Ukraine
Spanish expatriate sportspeople in China
Expatriate football managers in China
Spanish expatriate sportspeople in Lithuania
Expatriate football managers in Lithuania